Chronological list of buildings, projects and other works by Jean Nouvel.

References

 
Nouvel, Jean